UEN may refer to:

 Ueno Station, JR East station code
 Union for Environment and Nature
 Union for Europe of the Nations
 Urban East Norwegian
 Utah Education Network